Snide may refer to:
 Snide, a village in Gârda de Sus Commune, Alba County, Romania
 Corey Snide (born 1993), an American actor
 Snide the Weasel, a non-playable character in the video game Donkey Kong 64